Anthony Lewis Tolbert (born December 29, 1967) is a former American football defensive end in the National Football League (NFL) for the Dallas Cowboys. He played college football at the University of Texas-El Paso. He was drafted in the fourth round of the 1989 NFL Draft.

Early years
Tolbert grew up in Englewood, New Jersey, and attended Dwight Morrow High School, where he was an All-conference selection. He accepted a football scholarship from the University of Texas-El Paso.

He was light for a defensive end (6 feet 2 inches and 175 pounds as a freshman), but developed into a pass rusher.

As a junior, he was named the starter at outside linebacker, contributing to a 7-4 record, for the program first winning season since 1970. He posted 49 tackles (5 for loss), 4 sacks, 3 passes defensed, 2 forced fumbles and 2 fumble recoveries. Against Colorado State University, he tallied had 5 tackles and one sack, helping the school win its first football road game in seven years.

His best year was his senior season, when he tied a school record with 11 sacks, while making 101 tackles, 15 tackles for loss (led the team), 2 passes defensed, one forced fumble and earning All- WAC honors. UTEP's 1988 team is the winningest football team in school history with 10 wins. It also clinched its first bowl bid since 1967, losing 38-18 to Southern Mississippi University in the Independence Bowl.

In 2014, he was named to the UTEP football Centennial team. He graduated with a degree in criminal justice.

Professional career
Tolbert was selected by the Dallas Cowboys in the fourth round (85th overall) of the 1989 NFL Draft, after falling because he was considered a tweener (slow to play linebacker and light for a defensive end at 230 pounds). As a rookie, he was converted into a defensive end. He started 5 games at left defensive end over Ed "Too Tall" Jones, making 52 tackles, 2 sacks, 18 quarterback pressures, 5 passes defensed (led the team) and one forced fumble. He had 10 tackles, one pass defensed and one forced fumble against the Kansas City Chiefs.

In 1990, he played at both end positions and defensive tackle on passing downs. He started 4 games, in place of an injured Jim Jeffcoat and Danny Stubbs. He registered 55 tackles, 6 sacks (third on the team), 24 quarterback pressures (third on the team), 3 passes defensed and one forced fumble.

In 1991, he took advantage of a contract holdout by Stubbs and became the regular starter at left defensive end. He posted 73 tackles (fifth on the team), 7 sacks (led the team), 25 quarterback pressures (led the team), 5 passes defensed and 2 forced fumbles.

In 1996, he was named to the Pro Bowl, when he had a career-high of 12 sacks and 85 tackles.

Tolbert played with chronic knee pain through the final years of his career, because of a degenerative knee condition. Despite playing in pain, Tolbert started all 16 games in 1997, compiled five sacks and led all Cowboys defensive linemen in tackles for the seventh consecutive season, with 60. Tolbert's five sacks were the most on the team that year.

On June 16 1998, he was released because of his declining performance while playing on aching knees.

As a defensive end for the Cowboys from 1989-1997, he played an important role in the Cowboys' rise to prominence in the 1990s and their three Super Bowl victories. Tolbert became one of the stalwarts, on one of the best defenses of the 1990s. During that time, he teamed up with Charles Haley to become one of the top pass-rushing duos in the NFL. Although he came into the league as a pass rush specialist, he developed into an effective run stopper, making him the leading tackler among Cowboy defensive linemen for seven straight years.

During his career, he recorded 59 quarterback sacks in 128 games played over the course of 9 seasons, plus he returned his only interception 54 yards for a touchdown. He had more sacks during the 90s than any other Cowboy player.

Personal life
Ten years after he retired, he had knee-replacement surgery on both knees, the result of seven knee surgeries during his nine-year career.

References

1967 births
Living people
Dwight Morrow High School alumni
People from Englewood, New Jersey
Players of American football from New Jersey
American football defensive ends
UTEP Miners football players
Dallas Cowboys players
National Conference Pro Bowl players
Sportspeople from Bergen County, New Jersey
Ed Block Courage Award recipients